Pharyngeal branch can refer to any one of several different structures near the pharynx:
 Nerves
 Pharyngeal branch of vagus nerve - "ramus pharyngeus nervi vagi"
 Pharyngeal branches of recurrent laryngeal nerve - "rami pharyngei nervi laryngei recurrentis"
 Pharyngeal branches of glossopharyngeal nerve - "rami pharyngei nervi glossopharyngei"
 Pharyngeal nerve of pterygopalatine ganglion
 Arteries
 Pharyngeal branches of ascending pharyngeal artery - "rami pharyngeales arteriae pharyngeae ascendentis"
 Pharyngeal branch of artery of pterygoid canal - "ramus pharyngeus arteriae canalis pterygoidei"
 Pharyngeal branch of maxillary artery
 Pharyngeal branches of inferior thyroid artery - "rami pharyngeales arteriae thyroideae inferioris"